The 2005 San Marino Grand Prix (formally the Formula 1 Gran Premio Foster's di San Marino 2005) was a Formula One motor race held on 24 April 2005 at the Autodromo Enzo e Dino Ferrari in Imola, Italy. The 62-lap race was the fourth round of the 2005 Formula One season, and the 25th running of the San Marino Grand Prix.

The race was won by Renault driver Fernando Alonso, who extended his lead in the Drivers' Championship after his third win and fourth podium from four races. Michael Schumacher finished the race in second position for the Ferrari team, only two-tenths of a second behind Alonso having challenged him for the win late into the race. BAR driver Jenson Button crossed the line in third place, but his team were subsequently disqualified for underweight cars; third place was then awarded to McLaren driver Alexander Wurz.

Pole position was taken by McLaren driver Kimi Räikkönen, using the aggregate system which was in the rules at the start of the 2005 season. He led the race from the start until his retirement on lap 9 due to a driveshaft failure. Alonso took the lead and kept it except during the pit stop phases when it was held by Button, and later Schumacher when he overtook Button.

Friday drivers 
The bottom 6 teams in the 2004 Constructors' Championship were entitled to run a third car in free practice on Friday. These drivers drove on Friday but did not compete in qualifying or the race.

Report

Background
Vitantonio Liuzzi replaced Christian Klien in the second Red Bull car, for this and the next three races; after unanimous agreement between the teams, Klien was allowed to race car #37 for Red Bull in the Friday practice sessions. Alexander Wurz drove the second McLaren-Mercedes car, in place of the injured Juan Pablo Montoya. During the first qualifying session on Saturday, Red Bull announced that they would use Ferrari engines for two years, beginning from the 2006 season.

Race
Räikkönen led from pole, pulling out a gap of several seconds, before his McLaren retired on lap nine with driveshaft problems. Alonso took over the lead, and was unchallenged until lap 50, when Michael Schumacher emerged from the pits just behind him. Schumacher had started 13th, and had been unable to pass Jarno Trulli for 20 laps, until the Italian pitted allowing Schumacher to increase his pace. After pitting himself, he emerged in third place ahead of Trulli and started to catch race leader Alonso. He caught up with second place driver Jenson Button and overtook him, overturning a 20-second gap in 13 laps. After the second round of pit-stops he emerged from the pits seconds behind Alonso. The next 12 laps saw the two battle for the lead but Schumacher was unable to overtake Alonso who took the race victory. Third was Button, followed by Wurz's McLaren, Takuma Sato, Jacques Villeneuve, Trulli and Ralf Schumacher. Ralf was later given a 25-second penalty as he was released into the path of Nick Heidfeld; this temporarily dropped him to 11th place.

Post-Race 
During checks after the race it was found that Button's car had been under the 600 kg minimum weight requirement when drained of fuel. The race stewards cleared Button, as they believed data provided by BAR-Honda was sufficient to prove that they had been operating inside the rules, but the FIA appealed sending them to court. They were found guilty, but the FIA's preferred penalty of having the team disqualified from the championship for the year was not carried through, and they were given a two-race ban, starting from the next round in Spain. In addition, Button's teammate Sato, who had finished 5th on the track, was disqualified from the race despite his car not being found to be underweight. Wurz was thus promoted to third, followed by Villeneuve, Trulli, Heidfeld, Mark Webber and Liuzzi.

Classification

Qualifying
Qualifying times from both Saturday and Sunday morning.

Notes
  – Felipe Massa, Patrick Friesacher and Christijan Albers received a 10-place grid penalty for engine changes.

Race

Notes
  – Post-race, Ralf Schumacher was penalised 25 seconds for being released unsafely into the path of Nick Heidfeld from his second pitstop; Toyota withdrew their initial appeal before the hearing.
  – Also post-race, Jenson Button's car was found to be 4.99 kg (11 lb) underweight; stewards initially accepted BAR's explanation as a fuel system anomaly on April 25. However, on May 5, an FIA court of appeal disqualified both BAR cars and banned them from the next two races for "highly regrettable negligence and lack of transparency", noting that BAR's fuel system effectively "used fuel as ballast", illegal under current Formula One regulations.

Championship standings after the race 

Drivers' Championship standings

Constructors' Championship standings

Note: Only the top five positions are included for both sets of standings.

See also 
 2005 Imola GP2 Series round

Notes

References

San Marino Grand Prix
San Marino Grand Prix
San Marino Grand Prix
April 2005 sports events in Europe
Television controversies in the United Kingdom